Oak Creek is a tributary, about  long, of Marys River in Benton County in the U.S. state of Oregon. The stream descends from forested hills north of Corvallis through the northwest part of the city and across the campus of Oregon State University.

Course
Beginning in the Cardwell Hills northwest of Corvallis, the creek flows generally south through the McDonald State Forest to near  Bald Hill. It then flows southeast through the west side of the city and the Oregon State University campus to enter the river near Reser Stadium and Avery Park.

Its flow is altered by two dams, one in the forest and one on the university campus. Named tributaries of Oak Creek from source to mouth are Alder, Skunk, and Mulkey creeks and a more recent addition, Lamprey Creek, closest to the mouth.

Watershed
The university manages about 40 percent of the basin, some of it on campus near the mouth and some in the forest along the upper reaches.

History
Patricia Benner of the Department of Fisheries and Wildlife at Oregon State University, in a 1984 study of historic changes to Oak Creek, cited evidence of the one-time existence of three lumber mills on the upper reaches of the main stem and its tributaries and a carding mill along the lower main stem. The mills likely involved artificial dams, which blocked fish passage, and holding ponds and at least one flume, and these altered the stream flow and temperature. Along the lower reaches, there is evidence of channelization and in-fill of marshy areas. Although the stream course remains essentially the same as in the 19th century, the stream is less braided and its riparian zones less vegetated and more paved, all of which affect the fish and other organisms in the Oak Creek watershed.

Flora and fauna 
Second-growth forest dominates the land near the headwaters. Species include shrubs, red alder, and big leaf maple near the creek and its tributaries. Douglas fir and grand fir as well as oak, madrone, and Pacific yew grow on the ridge tops and hill slopes.

Bald Hill Natural Area,  along Mulkey Creek, was maintained as savanna by the Kalapuya people before early settlers, the Mulkey brothers, homesteaded here in 1845 and began farming. In 2013, the Greenbelt Land Trust bought the property, which consists of forest—including Oregon white oak on the higher ground—marshy savanna, braided stream channels and beaver ponds. The Trust, a conservation group concerned with the mid-Willamette Valley, is restoring damaged wildlife habitat while using the property for food production, hiking trails, and education.

In the 21st century, the stream supports populations of cutthroat trout. It also provides overwintering habitat for young Chinook salmon that ascend Marys River. Deer, beaver, and an occasional bear or cougar frequent the forested headwaters.

Recreation
Irish Bend Covered Bridge is a pedestrian bridge that spans Oak Creek on university property. Originally a bridge over Willamette Slough near Monroe, it was moved to Oak Creek in 1989. The bridge is listed on the National Register of Historic Places.

The trailhead is along Northwest Oak Creek Drive.

See also
List of rivers of Oregon

References

External links
Greenbelt Land Trust
Marys River Watershed Council

Rivers of Oregon
Rivers of Benton County, Oregon